Trail of Vengeance is a 1937 American Western film directed by Sam Newfield, written by Fred Myton and George H. Plympton, and starring Johnny Mack Brown, Iris Meredith, Warner Richmond, Karl Hackett, Earle Hodgins and Frank LaRue. It was released on March 29, 1937, by Republic Pictures.

Plot

Cast
Johnny Mack Brown as Dude Ramsay
Iris Meredith as Jean Warner
Warner Richmond as Link Carson
Karl Hackett as Bert Pearson 
Earle Hodgins as Buck Andrews 
Frank LaRue as Tilden
Frank Ellis as Henchman Red
Lew Meehan as Henchman Billy O'Donnell
Frank Ball as Steve Warner
Dick Curtis as Henchman Cartwright

References

External links
 

1937 films
American Western (genre) films
1937 Western (genre) films
Republic Pictures films
Films directed by Sam Newfield
American black-and-white films
Films with screenplays by George H. Plympton
1930s English-language films
1930s American films